Chidrac is a commune in the Puy-de-Dôme department in Auvergne-Rhône-Alpes in central France.

Geography
The commune is located 8 kilometers west of Issoire. It is located on the Couze Pavin, a small waterway that flows into the Allier at Issoire.

Population

See also
Communes of the Puy-de-Dôme department

References

Communes of Puy-de-Dôme